John Chapman (28 November 1814 – 14 April 1896) was an English first-class cricketer active 1842–48 who played for Nottinghamshire. He was born in West Bridgford, Nottingham and died in Gainsborough, Lincolnshire. He appeared in 13 first-class matches.

References

1814 births
1896 deaths
English cricketers
Gentlemen of Nottinghamshire cricketers
North v South cricketers
Nottingham Cricket Club cricketers
Nottinghamshire cricketers
Players of Nottinghamshire cricketers